Maksim Andreyevich Mukhin (born 4 November 2001) is a Russian professional footballer who plays as a defensive midfielder for CSKA Moscow and the Russia national team.

Club career
He made his debut in the Russian Premier League for FC Lokomotiv Moscow on 8 November 2020 in a game against FC Dynamo Moscow.

On 28 May 2021, he signed a 5-year contract with CSKA Moscow.

International career
He was called up to the Russia national football team for the first time in March 2021 for the World Cup qualifiers against Malta, Slovenia and Slovakia. He received his call-up at the age of 19 despite never before representing Russia at junior levels and only having 5 starts in the Russian Premier League at that point. Some of the other players at his defensive midfielder position were injured and other potential replacements were already registered for the 2021 UEFA European Under-21 Championship squad, the Under-21 Euro schedule conflicted with the World Cup qualifiers schedule. He made his debut on 27 March 2021 against Slovenia, substituting Rifat Zhemaletdinov in the 87th minute.

On 11 May 2021, he was included in the preliminary extended 30-man squad for UEFA Euro 2020. On 2 June 2021, he was included in the final squad. He appeared as a second half-substitute in all three of  Russia's group stage games as they were eliminated after beating Finland and losing to Belgium and Denmark.

Honours

Club
Lokomotiv Moscow
Russian Cup: 2020–21

Career statistics

Club

References

External links
 
 

2001 births
Sportspeople from Tolyatti
Living people
Russian footballers
Russia under-21 international footballers
Russia international footballers
Association football midfielders
FC Lokomotiv Moscow players
PFC CSKA Moscow players
Russian Premier League players
Russian Second League players
UEFA Euro 2020 players